Wolvega is a railway station in Wolvega, Netherlands. The station opened on 15 January 1868 and is on the Arnhem–Leeuwarden railway. The services are operated by Nederlandse Spoorwegen.

Train services

Bus services

Bus services at this station are operated by Arriva.

See also
 List of railway stations in Friesland

References

External links
NS website 
Dutch Public Transport journey planner 

Railway stations in Friesland
Railway stations opened in 1868
Railway stations on the Staatslijn A